Harper is an unincorporated community in Logan County, in the U.S. state of Ohio.

History
Harper was laid out in 1851 around the time the railroad was extended to that point. A post office called Harper was established in 1856, and remained in operation until 1934.

References

Unincorporated communities in Logan County, Ohio
1851 establishments in Ohio
Populated places established in 1851
Unincorporated communities in Ohio